Henry Strangways may refer to:

Henry Strangways (1832-1920), Premier of South Australia
Henry Strangways (pirate), aka Henry Strangwish, 16th-century pirate

See also
Henry Fox-Strangways (disambiguation)